Alexander Grenville Stewart Proudfoot (14 September 1906 – 24 June 1995) was an Australian rules footballer who played for the St Kilda Football Club and Melbourne Football Club in the Victorian Football League (VFL).

Family
The son of Alexander George Proudfoot (1873–1943) and Mabel Clemence (May) Grenville (1880–1906), Alexander Grenville Stewart Proudfoot was born at Queenstown, Tasmania on 14 September 1906. His mother died when he was one month old and he moved with his father to Coopers Creek in Gippsland.

Proudfoot was the nephew of Collingwood player Bill Proudfoot.

Football
Proudfoot initially travelled from Erica in Gippsland to play with St Kilda but after four senior appearances over 12 months he moved to Brunswick during the 1927 season.

After two strong season with Brunswick in the Victorian Football Association, Proudfoot transferred to Melbourne for the 1929 season. He made a single senior appearance in Round 14 before returning to Brunswick in 1930 and then moved to Coburg in 1932.

Notes

External links 

Alec Proudfoot's playing statistics from The VFA Project

1906 births
Australian rules footballers from Victoria (Australia)
St Kilda Football Club players
Melbourne Football Club players
Brunswick Football Club players
Coburg Football Club players
1995 deaths